Sylvia Schmelkes (born 28 July 1948) is a Mexican sociologist and education researcher, and current director of the Mexican National Institute of Educational Evaluation. She is best known for her work in intercultural education, and her book 'Toward better quality of our schools'. Schmelkes has also written over 100 academic texts and essays. She is a former General Coordinator of Intercultural and Bilingual Education at the Secretariat of Public Education in Mexico, and is currently heading the Research Institute for the Development of Education at the Iberoamerican University.

In 2008 she received the Comenius Medal from UNESCO for her career as a researcher. Other awards include the Universidad Iberoamericana's Tlamatini award in 2003, and the Maria Lavalle Urbina award in 1998. She has an honorary PhD from the Universidad Autónoma de Baja California in Mexico and an honorary Doctor of Law degree from the University of Concordia in Montreal, Canada.  She is an Honorary Fellow of the UNESCO Institute for Lifelong Learning.

Biography 

Schmelkes was born in Mexico City to a Czech father and an Argentinian mother. Educated in bilingual schools, she studied sociology at the Iberoamerican University in Mexico City and obtained a Master's degree in Education Research by the same institution. After this, Schmelkes worked in the Center for Educational Studies (CEE) in Mexico for almost 25 years, where she dedicated herself to research in the fields of rural and adult education. In 1994 she left the CEE to work as a consultant in the Educational Research Department at the National Polytechnic Institute, as well as for the UNESCO, UNICEF and OECD.

After this, Schmelkes started working on values education and Intercultural Education, becoming General Coordinator of Intercultural and Bilingual Education at the Secretariat of Public Education under Mexican President Vicente Fox. She currently works as Director of the Institute for the Development of Education at the Iberoamerican University in Mexico City. Schmelkes's work has been published in five languages by institutions such as the Mexican Secretariat of Public Education, UNESCO and the Organization of American States.

Bibliography 
 Hacia una mejor calidad de nuestras escuelas, SEP, 1995
 La formación de valores en la educación básica, SEP, 2004
 La educación de adultos y las cuestiones sociales, Centro de Cooperación Regional para la Educación de Adultos en América Latina y el Caribe, 2008

References

Mexican sociologists
Mexican women sociologists
1948 births
Living people
Mexican people of Czech descent
Mexican people of Argentine descent
Writers from Mexico City